Mijo Miletic (born 2 June 1998) is a Bosnian-Herzegovinian footballer who plays for Union Gurten in the Austrian third tier Regionalliga Mitte.

References

External links
 

1998 births
Living people
People from Kiseljak
Association football defenders
Bosnia and Herzegovina footballers
SV Ried players
2. Liga (Austria) players
Austrian Landesliga players
Austrian Regionalliga players
Bosnia and Herzegovina expatriate footballers
Expatriate footballers in Austria
Bosnia and Herzegovina expatriate sportspeople in Austria
SK Schärding players